Mesklin is a fictional supergiant planet created by Hal Clement and used in a number of his hard science fiction stories.

It is distinctive for the interaction of its strong gravity with the centrifugal force due to its fast rotation, originating, according to Clement's original calculations, a gradient in the perceived force of gravity from 3 g on the equator to 665 g on the planet's poles.

Overview
The planet first appeared in the novel Mission of Gravity, which was serialized in Astounding Science Fiction (April–July 1953). Other fictional works using the planet or its denizens include Under, Lecture Demonstration, and Star Light. The book Heavy Planet is a collection of Mesklin-related works.

Clement described the basic characteristics of Mesklin in the article "Whirligig World" in Astounding Science Fiction (June 1953). He based the world on an object then thought to exist in the 61 Cygni system, which had been detected by analysis of the motion of the two already known stars in the system. Further analysis with more extensive data led to the conclusion that the find had been erroneous.

Clement decided, since its mass was 16 times that of Jupiter, Mesklin would have an extremely large angular frequency to partly counter its gravity in order to allow humans to visit part of it. He wanted the equatorial gravity to be 3 g, so he determined the period necessary to make this occur: each Mesklin day is 17.75 minutes long given that the planet rotates approximately 20 degrees a minute.

As a result of this extremely large rate of spin, Mesklin is not even slightly spherical; it has a large equatorial bulge. Mesklin's equatorial diameter is 48,000 miles (77,250 km), while from pole-to-pole along its axis of rotation it is 19,740 miles (31,770 km). Then Clement attempted to calculate the polar gravity, finding it surprisingly difficult. He admits, "To be perfectly frank, I don't know the exact value of the polar gravity; the planet is so oblate that the usual rule of spheres... would not even be a good approximation..." "Whirligig World" reports his initial calculations of the pole gravity to be 655 g; the dust jacket of Heavy Planet reports it as 700 g. A later program created by Clement computed it as 275 g, as did a similar program written by the MIT Science Fiction Society. The MIT group also concluded that the planet would have had a sharp edge at the equator. Clement also gave Mesklin a set of rings and massive moons.

Clement assumed Mesklin's orbit around its star (which he decided would be 61 Cygni A) took 1,800 Earth-days, and was highly elliptical: at its closest point the average temperature would be −50 °C, while at the furthest its average temperature would be −180 °C. Since the orbit is eccentric it moves rapidly past its sun at the closest point, so its temperature would be around −170 °C most of the time.

Clement decided this imaginary world would have native life-forms, that they would be based on methane (CH4), and there would be oceans of methane. However, methane has a low boiling point, suggesting that Mesklin's sun might boil its oceans and cause the methane to escape the planet entirely. Thus, the writer arranged the planet so its northern hemisphere's midsummer occurs when it is nearest its sun. Thus, the northern hemisphere would develop a large frozen methane cap during most of its year; the southern hemisphere (where most creatures live) is protected from the sun's closest approach by the rest of the planet. He also asserted the planet would have a fairly rapid precession.

Clement noted that several of his story ideas resulted from a personal tendency to react contrarily to certain "common sense" assertions, which had the nature of "of course": [some situation] has [some certain characteristic], but of course it cannot have [some other characteristic]. The notion of Mesklin's odd configuration stemmed from the fact that there were science fiction stories that featured low-gravity planets and high-gravity planets, but of course no single planet could have both low and high gravity.

In "Whirligig World", Clement stated he gave "official permission to anyone who so desires to lay scenes there [in Mesklin]. I ask only that he maintain reasonable scientific standards, and that's certainly an elastic requirement in the field of science fiction."

Mesklin, "Whirligig World", and the Clement stories based on them are important in science fiction because they illustrated how to carefully incorporate all known (at the time) scientific facts into an interesting setting, which could then be used as a basis to create interesting stories. They were also the first stories set outside the solar system on a planet believed (then) to actually exist.

See also
 Jinx, a strongly prolate (rugby football shaped) planet in Larry Niven's Known Space setting.

References

 Clement, Hal.  2002. Heavy Planet. .

Fictional giant planets
Fictional elements introduced in 1953